Elections to Suffolk County Council were held on 5 May 2005. The whole council was up for election with boundary changes since the last election in 2001 reducing the number of seats by 5. The Conservative Party gained control of the council from no overall control.

All locally registered electors (British, Irish, Commonwealth and European Union citizens) who were aged 18 or over on Thursday 4 May 2005 were entitled to vote in the local elections. Those who were temporarily away from their ordinary address (for example, away working, on holiday, in student accommodation or in hospital) were also entitled to vote in the local elections, although those who had moved abroad and registered as overseas electors cannot vote in the local elections. It is possible to register to vote at more than one address (such as a university student who had a term-time address and lives at home during holidays) at the discretion of the local Electoral Register Office, but it remains an offence to vote more than once in the same local government election.

Summary
The ruling Labour-Liberal Democrat coalition had become increasingly unpopular following a number of significant council tax rises.  The opposition Conservatives were successful in highlighting this to their benefit.

Both the Liberal Democrats and Labour endured heavy losses to the Conservatives in rural areas, but they performed better in urban Suffolk.  The Conservatives failed to gain a single seat in Ipswich and Lowestoft, for example.

Government Formation
With a 7 seat majority, Conservative group leader Jeremy Pembroke (Cosford) became the new council leader. Outgoing council leader Bryony Rudkin (Bridge) remained as Labour group leader and Kathy Pollard (Belstead Brook) became Lib Dem group leader.

Election result

Results by District

Babergh

District Summary

Division results

Forest Heath

District Summary

Division results

Ipswich

District Summary

Division results

Mid Suffolk

District Summary

Division results

Suffolk Coastal

District Summary

Division results

St. Edmundsbury

District Summary

Division results

}

Waveney

District Summary

Division results

}

}

						

}

References

Councillor's names in bold were Elected

2005 English local elections
2005
2000s in Suffolk